Criggion Radio Station was a transmitter site latterly operated by BT on behalf of the UK Ministry of Defence. It was located near the village of Criggion in the parish of Bausley with Criggion, which lies in the county of Powys, Wales.

It was established in World War II as a back-up unit for Rugby Radio Station and took over the latter's traffic for a short period in 1943 following a fire at Rugby. Operating on 19.6 kHz with the callsign GBZ, the station was used until its shutdown on 1 April 2003 for sending messages to submarines. This task (and that of Rugby) is now carried out by the Anthorn radio station. The towers and masts were demolished in August 2003 but, although there is now less obvious visible evidence that a large radio station existed on the site, the derelict main transmitting building still survived in 2011 and the foundation sites of the former masts can be still be located on satellite and aerial photographs.

 the remaining parts of the station were reported to be in a state of disrepair.

Gallery

References

External links
 http://newsimg.bbc.co.uk/1/hi/wales/mid/3176253.stm
 http://www.subbrit.org.uk/sb-sites/sites/c/criggion_radio/index.shtml
 http://www.oswestry-history.co.uk/criggion-radio-station.html
 http://www.oswestry-history.co.uk/criggion/images/vlf-aerial-layout.jpg
 http://skyscraperpage.com/diagrams/?b61508
 http://skyscraperpage.com/diagrams/?b61510

Former radio masts and towers
Military radio systems
Transmitter sites in Wales
British Telecom buildings and structures
Buildings and structures in Powys